The Square and Tower: Networks, Hierarchies and the Struggle for Global Power is a book by Niall Ferguson, published in 2018 by Penguin Books, where he explains how those at the top of the towers of power have been overstated, and the influence of "the social networks down below, in the town squares" has been underestimated. His aim is to highlight and correct this historical oversight. In The Daily Telegraph, historian Peter Frankopan described the book as "provocative". In Prospect, David Goodhart called the book "immensely stimulating, absorbing, illuminating ... sends ideas blazing all over the place".

References 

Books about social history
Books by Niall Ferguson
2018 non-fiction books
Penguin Books books